The Lagos State Head of Service is the highest rank of the Lagos State Civil Service.
The appointment is often confirmed by the Governor of Lagos State subject to the approval of the State House of Assembly.
The appointment is often based on the years of experience and services at the State Civil Service and preferably, a serving permanent secretary.
The position was formerly combined with the Secretary to the State Government during the Military regime and the appointed civil servant automatically becomes the Deputy Governor of the state but the offices were separated in 1999.

Heads of service
Babatunde Tajudeen Rotinwa
Balogun Yakub Abiodun
 Rafiu Babatunde Tinubu
Akinsanya Sunny Ajose
Adesegun Olusola Ogunlewe
 Josephine Oluseyi Williams
Folashade Sherifat Jaji
Olabowale Ademola
Folashade Adesoye
Hakeem Muri-Okunola

References

Civil service in Lagos State